The shy albatross,  also known as shy mollymawk, (Thalassarche cauta, formerly Diomedea cauta),  is a medium-sized albatross that breeds on three remote islands off the coast of Tasmania, Australia, in the southern Indian Ocean. Its lifespan is about 60 years, and it has been seen as far afield as South Africa and the Pacific coast of the United States. , the species is listed as "Endangered" in Australia; there are thought to be 15,000 pairs of shy albatross left. It is Australia's only endemic albatross.

Some authorities call this species the white-capped albatross, but the White-capped albatross is generally the common name given to Thalassarche cauta steadi.

Taxonomy

This mollymawk was once considered to be the same species as the Salvin's albatross, Thalassarche salvini and the Chatham albatross, Thalassarche eremita, but they were split around 2004. In 1998, Robertson and Nunn suggested a four-way split including the white-capped albatross, Thalassarche steadi. The three-way split was accepted by Brooke in 2004, the ACAP in 2006, SACC in 2008, and BirdLife International by 2000. James Clements was the last major holdout on the three-way split but later accepted it. The fourth split, steadi, was only accepted by the ACAP in 2006, and BirdLife International in 2008. Finally, following Brooke, this species was shifted from Diomedea to Thalassarche, which was generally agreed upon by most experts.

Some authorities, notably the American Ornithological Society, call this species the white-capped albatross.

Mollymawks belong to the albatross family, Diomedeidae, which shares the order Procellariiformes with shearwaters, fulmars, storm petrels, and diving petrels. Procellariiformes have certain identifying features. They have nasal passages that attach to the upper bill, called naricorns (although the nostrils on the albatross are on the sides of the bill). The bills are also unique in that they are split into between seven and nine horny plates. They produce a stomach oil made up of wax esters and triglycerides that is stored in the proventriculus. This is used against predators as well as an energy-rich food source for chicks and for the adults during their long flights. They also have a salt gland that is situated above the nasal passage and helps desalinate their bodies, required due to the high amount of ocean water that they imbibe. It excretes a high saline solution from their nose.

Within Australia, the bird is still shown as Diomedea cauta, Diomedea cauta cauta, or Thalassarche cauta cauta in some legislation and databases.

Description
Alongside its similarly sized sister species, the Salvin's albatross, this species is considered the largest of the mollymawks or the small albatrosses. It is a black, white and slate-grey bird with the characteristic black thumb mark at the base of the leading edge of the underwing. Adults have a white forehead and a crown, which is bordered on the bottom with a dark eyebrow and pale grey face. Its mantle, tail and upperwing are grey-black, and the rest is white. Its bill is grey-yellow with a prominent yellow culmen and yellow tip.

It has a lifespan of about 60 years.

Behaviour

Feeding
Fish, cephalopods, crustacea, and tunicates are the sustenance for this species.

Reproduction
The shy albatross breeds on rocky islands and builds mounded nests of soil, grass, and roots. They lay one egg in the second half of September.

Flight endurance
Some shy albatross are able to fly  in 24 hours.

Range and habitat

The shy albatross is endemic breeder to Australia and it breeds on three island colonies off Tasmania, in the southern Indian Ocean: Albatross Island, Pedra Branca, and the Mewstone. It is the only albatross endemic to Australia.

Juvenile birds are known to fly as far as South Africa; otherwise, non-breeding birds can be found throughout the southern oceans, but specifics are hard to determine due to their similarity to the other species. It is sometimes found off the Pacific coast of the United States.

Conservation
The population from an estimate in 2007 was 25,500 breeding birds with 5,100 pairs on Albatross Island, 270 pairs on Pedra Branca, and 7,380 on the Mewstone. Historically, they were exploited for their feathers, and by 1909 there were only 300 pairs left on Albatross Island.

Today, longline fishing still impacts this species but their numbers have been maintained despite this threat. They also had an avian pox outbreak on Albatross Island that has impacted their numbers slightly. Finally, the Australasian gannet, Morus serrator is the primary threat to their survival.

In June 2020, the Australian Government changed the status of the bird under the Environment Protection and Biodiversity Conservation Act 1999 from "Vulnerable" to "Endangered", with the bird facing the main threats from climate change and fisheries (as bycatch victims, either caught in trawling nets, or on hooks in the longline fishing industry), as well as disease and competition with other seabirds. The change in status is not considered to be due to poor management. Listings under state and territory legislation were mostly still "vulnerable" at this time.

The bird can only be monitored on Albatross Island, as the other two islands are inaccessible, but there are thought to be 15,000 pairs of shy albatross left.

Footnotes

References
 
Alsop III, Fred J.(2001). Smithsonian Birds of North America. Dorling Kindersley 

 
 
 
 
 
 
 

 
 
 

 
 
 
 
 
Woods, R. & Gales, R. (2008), in litt.

External links

 Shy Albatross - Species text in The Atlas of Southern African Birds.

shy albatross
Birds of South Australia
Birds of Tasmania
Birds of Victoria (Australia)
Birds of Western Australia
Birds of the Indian Ocean
shy albatross
shy albatross